Sidney Catlin Partridge (September 1, 1857 – June 22, 1930) was the first Bishop of Kyoto (1900–1911) and the second Bishop of the Episcopal Diocese of West Missouri (1911–1930).

Early life and education
Partridge was born in New York City on September 1, 1857 to George Sidney Partridge and Helen Derby Catlin. He graduated from Yale in 1880, where he served on the eighth editorial board of The Yale Record and was a member of Skull and Bones. He then undertook studies at Berkeley Divinity School and graduated in 1884.

Ordained Ministry
John Williams, Bishop of Connecticut, ordained Partridge to the diaconate on June 4, 1884 at the Church of the Holy Trinity in Middletown, Connecticut. He then worked as a missionary in China under Bishop William Jones Boone, Jr. who ordained him a priest in 1885. Between 1884 and 1887 he served as an instructor in natural science at St John's Missionary College in Shanghai and was treasurer of the mission. He then was in charge of Bishop Bonne Memorial School in Wuchang until 1899 where he taught Chinese and English. He was also involved in teaching bible studies at St Peter's Divinity School.

Bishop
In January 1900, Partridge was elected as the first Missionary Bishop of Kyoto in Japan, and was consecrated on February 2, 1900, in Trinity Cathedral, Tokyo by the Bishop of Tokyo John McKim. Other bishops in attendance included:

William Awdry, Bishop of South Tokyo
Hugh James Foss, Bishop of Osaka
Philip Kemball Fyson, Bishop of Hokkaido
Frederick Rogers Graves, Bishop of Shanghai
John McKim, Bishop of North Tokyo

He was decorated as a Knight of the Order of the Dannebrog following his marriage to the daughter of the Danish consul general at San Francisco on November 27, 1901. In 1911, he was elected Bishop of West Missouri and was installed on June 27, 1911. He was a bishop associate of the American Branch of the Confraternity of the Blessed Sacrament. On June 12, 1928, Rev. Partridge offered the invocation at the opening of the 1928 Republican National Convention in Kansas City.

He died in Kansas City, Missouri due to double lobar pneumonia. He was buried in Forest Hill Calvary Cemetery in Kansas City, Missouri.

References

Anglican Church in Japan
1857 births
1930 deaths
Knights of the Order of the Dannebrog
Berkeley Divinity School alumni
Yale University alumni
Anglican bishops of Kyoto
Episcopal bishops of West Missouri
Psi Upsilon